Ryszard is the Polish equivalent of "Richard", and may refer to:

Ryszard Andrzejewski (born 1976), Polish rap musician, songwriter and producer
Ryszard Bakst (1926–1999), Polish and British pianist and piano teacher of Jewish/Polish/Russian origin
Ryszard Bartel (1897–1982), Polish engineer, aircraft designer, pioneer and aviator
Ryszard Bender (born 1932), Polish politician and historian, specialist in the history of the January Uprising
Ryszard Wincenty Berwiński (1817–1879), Polish poet, translator, folklorist, and nationalist
Ryszard Białous (1914–1992), Polish scoutmaster (harcmistrz) captain of the AK-Szare Szeregi
Ryszard Bober (born 1956), Polish politician, Vice-Chairperson of Kuyavian-Pomeranian Regional Assembly
Ryszard Bogusz (born 1951), Lutheran theologian, bishop of the diocese Wroclaw of the Evangelical Augsburg Church in Poland
Ryszard Bolesławski (1889–1937), Polish film director, actor and teacher of acting
Ryszard Bosek (born 1950), former volleyball player from Poland, played in the team that won the gold medal at the 1976 Summer Olympics
Ryszard Bugaj (born 1944), Polish politician and economist, former advisor to Lech Kaczyński
Ryszard Bugajski (born 1943), Polish film director and screenwriter
Ryszard Ćwikła (1946–1992), Polish alpine skier who competed in the 1968 Winter Olympics
Ryszard Cyroń (born 1965), retired Polish football player
Ryszard Czarnecki (born 1963), British-born Polish politician, Member of the European Parliament
Ryszard Czerniawski (born 1952), Polish lawyer and economist
Ryszard Czerwiec (born 1968), Polish football player
Ryszard Dembinski (1924–2008), Polish Cavalry officer and D-Day Veteran
Ryszard Długosz (born 1941), Polish former wrestler
Ryszard Engelking (born 1935), Polish mathematician
Ryszard Filipski (born 1934), Polish actor
Ryszard Gajewski (born 1954), Polish mountaineer
Ryszard Galla (born 1956), Polish politician
Ryszard Garnys (born 1947), retired Polish triple jumper
Ryszard Gawlor (born 1943), Polish luger who competed in the late 1960s
Ryszard Głowacki (born 1937), Polish engineer of geology, writer and publicist
Ryszard Grobelny (born 1963), mayor of Poznań since 1998
Ryszard Gryglewski (born 1932), Polish physician
Ryszard Grzegorczyk (born 1939), former Polish football player
Ryszard Horowitz (born 1939), born in Kraków, Poland
Ryszard Jankowski (born 1960), retired Polish footballer (goalkeeper)
Ryszard Jedliński (born 1953), former Polish handball player
Ryszard Kaczorowski hon GCMG (1919–2010), the last President of the Polish government in exile
Ryszard Kaczyński (born 1954), Polish politician
Ryszard Kalisz (born 1957), Polish politician
Ryszard Kapuściński (1932–2007), Polish journalist whose dispatches in book form brought him a global reputation
Ryszard Katus (born 1947), Polish athlete, competed mainly in the men's decathlon
Ryszard Knosala (born 1949), Polish politician
Ryszard Komornicki (born 1959), retired Polish footballer, currently manager of Górnik Zabrze
Ryszard Koncewicz (died 2001), Polish soccer player as well as a coach
Ryszard Kornacki (born 1940), it a Polish poet and essayist from Międzyrzec Podlaski
Ryszard Kosiński (1955–2010), Polish sprint canoeist who competed in the mid-1970s
Ryszard Kotla (born 1947), Polish travel writer, tour guide, activist, journalist, academic teacher and lifeguard instructor
Ryszard Kubiak (born 1950), Polish rower who competed in three Olympics
Ryszard Kukliński (1930–2004), Polish colonel and Cold War spy
Ryszard Kulesza (born 1931), Polish footballer, coach and official
Ryszard Jaxa-Małachowski Kulisicz, Peruvian architect of Polish and Slovak origin
Ryszard Kunze (born 1939), Polish fencer
Oskar Ryszard Lange (1904–1965), Polish economist and diplomat
Ryszard Legutko (born 1949), Polish professor of philosophy, writer and politician
Ryszard Lubicz, fictional character from Polish television series Klan
Ryszard Malachowskis (born 1965), retired male decathlete
Ryszard Marchlik (born 1939), Polish sprint canoeist who competed in the 1960s
Ryszard Marczak (born 1945), former long-distance runner from Poland
Ryszard Marzec (1931–1972), Polish field hockey player
Ryszard Mordarski (born 1976), Polish slalom canoeist who competed in the mid-1990s
Ryszard Musielak (born 1950), one of the leaders of the Polish illegal Solidarity union in Toruń
Ryszard Nowak, Polish politician, member of Prawo i Sprawiedliwość (Law and Justice) party
Ryszard Oborski (born 1952), Polish sprint canoeist
Ryszard Ochyra (born 1949), Polish bryologist
Ryszard Ostrowski (born 1961), male former track and field middle distance runner from Poland
Ryszard Pacławski (born 1958), Polish lawyer, Scoutmaster and former Chief Scout from 1991 to 2000
Ryszard Parulski (born 1938), Polish fencer
Ryszard Pawłowski (born 1950), Polish alpine and high-altitude climber and photographer
Ryszard Pędrak-Janowicz (1932–2004), Polish luger
Ryszard Peryt (born 1947), Polish opera director, conductor, producer and actor
Andrzej Ryszard Piątkowski (1934–2010), Polish sabreur and Olympic medallist
Ryszard Piec (1913–1979), Polish soccer player
Ryszard Pilarczyk (born 1975), former Polish athlete specializing in sprinting events
Ryszard Podlas (born 1954), Polish athlete who competed mainly in the 400 metres
Ryszard Przecicki (1934–2009), Australian businessman, chairman of Visy Industries
Ryszard Przybysz (1950–2002), Polish handball player
Ryszard Reiff (1923–2007), Polish politician, lawyer, publicist and resistance fighter
Ryszard Riedel (1956–1994), lead singer of the blues-rock band Dżem
Ryszard Rumianek (1947–2010), the rector of Cardinal Stefan Wyszyński University in Warsaw
Ryszard Schnepf, Polish politician, deputy foreign minister from 2007 to 2008
Ryszard Ścigalski (born 1954), Polish former wrestler who competed in the 1980 Summer Olympics
Ryszard Seruga (born 1953), Polish slalom canoeist who competed in the 1970s and 1980s
Krzysztof Ryszard Sikora (born 1959), Polish politician
Ryszard Siwiec (1909–1968), the first person to commit suicide by self-immolation in protest against the Soviet-led invasion of Czechoslovakia
Ryszard Skowronek (born 1949), retired male decathlete from Poland
Ryszard Skwarski (born 1930), Polish sprint canoeist
Ryszard Sobczak (born 1967), Polish fencer
Ryszard Stadniuk (born 1951), Polish rower
Ryszard Stanibula (born 1950), member of the Polish People’s Party
Ryszard Staniek (born 1973), former Polish football midfielder
Ryszard Świętochowski (1882–1941), Polish politician, publicist and engineer
Ryszard Syski (1924–2007), Polish-American mathematician
Ryszard Szurkowski (born 1946), retired road bicycle racer from Poland
Ryszard Szymczak (1944–1996), former Polish football player
Ryszard Tarasiewicz (born 1962), retired Polish football player
Ryszard Tomczyk (born 1959), Polish politician, a historian, and a member of Local government
Ryszard Torzecki (1925–2003), Polish historian, specializing in the Polish-Ukrainian relations
Ryszard Tylewski (born 1952), Polish sprint canoeist who competed in the mid-1970s
Ryszard Wasko, Polish artist in multimedia, photography, film, video, installation, painting, and drawing
Ryszard Wawryniewicz (born 1962), Polish politician
Ryszard Wieczorek (born 1962), manager of the Polish football team Górnik Zabrze
Ryszard Wójcik (born 1956), retired Polish football referee
Ryszard Wolny (born 1969), Polish wrestler and Olympic champion in Greco-Roman wrestling
Ryszard Zakrzewski, Polish traveler, topographer, and an officer in the Russian Army who lived in the 19th century
Ryszard Zbrzyzny (born 1955), Polish politician
Ryszard Zub (born 1934), Polish fencer

Polish masculine given names